WOTT (94.1 MHz, "94 Rock") is a commercial FM radio station licensed to Calcium, New York and serving the Watertown area of New York State.  It is owned by Community Broadcasters, LLC, and it airs a mainstream rock radio format.

History

It was originally a country music station, with the call letters WLKC, before taking the current call sign as an oldies station with the on-air name "WOTT (pronounced "watt") Fun Oldies."

After dropping the oldies format and nickname, the station took a classic rock format as "Real Rock 100.7."  In early 2007, the station began experimenting with guest DJs and announced that the station would be undergoing some changes.  The station rebranded itself as "Rock 100.7".

On February 9, 2009, the station switched frequencies from 100.7 to 94.1 and boosted its power from 6,000 watts to 21,500 watts, allowing the station to reach northern Jefferson county and Lewis county, areas which could never receive the station before. The new class C3 station it moved to was put on the air by Community Broadcasters, LLC after it was purchased from LiveAir Communications, Inc. in January, 2009. The station's format and call letters are still the same, but the station's name was changed from Rock 100.7 to Rock 94.

The former 100.7 frequency now belongs to the station WEFX, 100.7 The Fox.

References

External links

OTT
Album-oriented rock radio stations in the United States